Leucochromodes is a genus of moths of the family Crambidae.

Species
Leucochromodes analytica (Dyar, 1914)
Leucochromodes bicoloralis (Dyar, 1910)
Leucochromodes eupharamacis (Dyar, 1914)
Leucochromodes euphthinylla (Dyar, 1914)
Leucochromodes melusinalis (Walker, 1859)
Leucochromodes peruvensis (Hampson, 1912)
Leucochromodes saltigalis (Druce, 1895)
Leucochromodes trinitensis (Hampson, 1912)

References

Spilomelinae
Crambidae genera
Taxa named by Hans Georg Amsel